The electoral division of Apsley was an electorate of the Tasmanian Legislative Council, it was created in 1999 and abolished in 2017.

As of 31 January 2015, there were 23,424 enrolled voters in the division.

The division was created in 1999 and named after the Apsley River, named after Lord Apsley, Earl Bathurst, and included the towns of Pipers River, Scottsdale, Evandale, Swansea, Derby, Lilydale, Bridport, Campbell Town, Colebrook, St Helens, Branxholm, Avoca, Fingal, Bicheno, Bagdad, Bellingham, Tomahawk, Ross, St Marys, Rossarden and many others.

Members

See also

 Tasmanian House of Assembly

References

External links
Parliament of Tasmania
Tasmanian Electoral Commission - Legislative Council

Former electoral divisions of Tasmania
North East Tasmania
East Coast Tasmania